José Ignacio Bollaín Ochoa (born 6 October 1974), commonly known as Iñaki, is a Spanish footballer who plays for SD Noja as a right defender.

Football career
Born in Santander, Cantabria, Iñaki made his senior debuts in the 1992–93 season with local CD Laredo, in Tercera División. One year later he first arrived in Segunda División B, signing with neighbouring Gimnástica de Torrelavega.

In the 1994 summer, Iñaki joined Racing de Santander: on 4 September he appeared in his first La Liga game, playing the last 20 minutes in a 0–0 home draw against Real Valladolid. On 8 January of the following year he scored his first goal in the top flight, netting the third in a 3–2 home win over Valencia CF.

In December 1997 Iñaki moved to Levante UD, in Segunda División. In his first year he played 20 matches but suffered team relegation, and, after leaving in the 1999 summer, resumed his career in the third and fourth levels, representing Jerez CF, SD Noja (two stints), Novelda CF, Burgos CF (two spells), CF Palencia, Laredo, Sangonera Atlético CF, Granada CF and CD Roquetas; with the last two clubs he achieved promotion to division three in 2006 and 2008, respectively.

References

External links
 
 Futbolme profile  

1974 births
Living people
Spanish footballers
Footballers from Santander, Spain
Association football defenders
La Liga players
Segunda División players
Segunda División B players
Tercera División players
Gimnástica de Torrelavega footballers
Racing de Santander players
Levante UD footballers
Burgos CF footballers
CF Palencia footballers
Granada CF footballers
CD Roquetas footballers